In mathematical logic, structural proof theory is the subdiscipline of proof theory that studies proof calculi that support a notion of analytic proof, a kind of proof whose semantic properties are exposed. When all the theorems of a logic formalised in a structural proof theory have analytic proofs, then the proof theory can be used to demonstrate such things as consistency, provide decision procedures, and allow mathematical or computational witnesses to be extracted as counterparts to theorems, the kind of task that is more often given to model theory.

Analytic proof

The notion of analytic proof was introduced into proof theory by Gerhard Gentzen for the sequent calculus; the analytic proofs are those that are cut-free. His natural deduction calculus also supports a notion of analytic proof, as was shown by Dag Prawitz; the definition is slightly more complex—the analytic proofs are the normal forms, which are related to the notion of normal form in term rewriting.

Structures and connectives
However, it is important to note that there is a fundamental difference in behaviour between these operators and the logical connectives they are interpreted by in the sequent calculus: the structural operators are used in every rule of the calculus, and are not considered when asking whether the subformula property applies. Furthermore, the logical rules go one way only: logical structure is introduced by logical rules, and cannot be eliminated once created, while structural operators can be introduced and eliminated in the course of a derivation.

The idea of looking at the syntactic features of sequents as special, non-logical operators is not old, and was forced by innovations in proof theory: when the structural operators are as simple as in Getzen's original sequent calculus there is little need to analyse them, but proof calculi of deep inference such as display logic (introduced by Nuel Belnap in 1982) support structural operators as complex as the logical connectives, and demand sophisticated treatment.

Cut-elimination in the sequent calculus

Natural deduction and the formulae-as-types correspondence

Logical duality and harmony

Hypersequents 

The hypersequent framework extends the ordinary sequent structure to a multiset of sequents, using an additional structural connective | (called the hypersequent bar) to separate different sequents. It has been used to provide analytic calculi for, e.g., modal, intermediate and substructural logics A hypersequent is a structure

where each  is an ordinary sequent, called a component of the hypersequent. As for sequents, hypersequents can be based on sets, multisets, or sequences, and the components can be single-conclusion or multi-conclusion sequents. The formula interpretation of the hypersequents depends on the logic under consideration, but is nearly always some form of disjunction. The most common interpretations are as a simple disjunction

for intermediate logics, or as a disjunction of boxes

for modal logics.

In line with the disjunctive interpretation of the hypersequent bar, essentially all hypersequent calculi include the external structural rules, in particular the external weakening rule

and the external contraction rule

The additional expressivity of the hypersequent framework is provided by rules manipulating the hypersequent structure. An important example is provided by the modalised splitting rule

Another example is given by the communication rule for the intermediate logic LC

Note that in the communication rule the components are single-conclusion sequents.

Calculus of structures

Nested sequent calculus

The nested sequent calculus is a formalisation that resembles a 2-sided calculus of structures.

Notes

References 
 
 

Proof theory